{{Infobox school
 | name                    = San Pedro Senior High School
 | image                   = San_pedro_pirates_logo.gif
 | image size              = 150px
 | motto                   = "Wisdom, Integrity and Self-Respect"
 | principal               = Raymond Aubele
 | dean                    = John Bobich, Denise Marovich-Sampson
 | location                = 1001 West 15th Street
 | city                    = San Pedro
 | state                   = California
 | zipcode                 = 90744
 | country                 = USA
 | homepage                = http://www.sanpedrohs.org/
 | type                    = Public
 | enrollment              = 2,549 (2019-20)
 | faculty                 = 104.00 (FTE)
 | ratio                   = 23.06
 | established             = 1903
 | mascot                  = Pirate Pete & YoHo the Parrot
 | colors                  =   Black and Gold
 | conference              = Marine LeagueCIF Los Angeles City Section
 | newspaper               = Fore N Aft
 | yearbook                = Black and Gold | free_label_1            = Phone
 | free_1                  = (310) 241-5800
}}

San Pedro High School is a public high school in the Los Angeles Unified School District and is located in the San Pedro portion of the city of Los Angeles, California. The school serves the entirety of San Pedro as well as most of the Eastview neighborhood of Rancho Palos Verdes. In 2003, the school celebrated its 100th Anniversary.

History
It was in the Los Angeles City High School District until 1961, when it merged into LAUSD.

Renovations for most of the campus are expected to be finished by 2023.

Facilities
San Pedro High School is home to two protected landmarks, the Administration Building and Language Arts Building. Both were constructed in 1936 under mandate from the Works Progress Administration. San Pedro High School also has a Mathematics and Sciences Building, a Vocational Arts Building, a cafeteria, numerous bungalow-style classrooms, and three gymnasiums.

The school and its surroundings were the area where much of the filming for the movie Some Kind of Wonderful'' was shot.

Demographics
As of the school year 2008-09, the racial breakdown included:

67.1% Hispanic 
19.0% White
9.8% African American 
0.7% Native American 
3.5% Asian 
0.5% Pacific Islander

Athletics
San Pedro High School is also home to the Golden Pirate Regiment (Band and Colorguard), 2015 and 2016 Southern California School Band and Orchestra Association (SCSBOA) and LAUSD city division 1A Field Champions. In 2017 the Golden Pirate Regiment won its third straight championship for SCSBOA And LAUSD City in the 2A Division. In 2018 the Golden Pirate Regiment won the 2018 SCSBOA and LAUSD championships for the 2A Division. In 2019, the regiment won its fifth straight SCSBOA and LAUSD championship, but this time in the 3A Division. The School's Comprehensive Modernization Project is beginning in 2018. The sports programs at San Pedro High School have won over 60 CIF-Los Angeles City Section championships, with softball leading the way capturing 17 crowns. The swimming and diving team won the high school’s most recent championship in 2022, its first ever title, led by coaches Jean Wagoner and Will Douglass.

Notable alumni 

 Alan Ashby, 1969, former catcher in the Houston Astros, now a sportscaster.
John Bettis, lyricist
 Mario Danelo, 2003, NCAA placekicker
 Eric Erlandson, 1981, co-founder and lead guitarist for 1990s rock/grunge band Hole. 
 Anna Lee Fisher, 1967, first mother in space, 1984 crew member of Space Shuttle Discovery
 Brian Harper, 1977, former Major League Baseball Player.
 Art Pepper, jazz alto saxophonist
 D. L. Hughley, actor and comedian
 Otis Livingston, 1985, sportscaster and sideline reporter
 Garry Maddox, 1968, former MLB player
 Haven Moses, NFL wide receiver
 Willie Naulls, 1952, former NBA player
 John Olguin, 1941, director of the Cabrillo Marine Aquarium
Miguel Jontel Pimentel, 2003, singer, won the Grammy for best R&B song in 2013.
C. Waldo Powers, 1918, architect behind many historic Los Angeles apartment houses
 Mike Watt, D. Boon and George Hurley, 1976, members of punk band Minutemen.
 Brenton Wood, 1963, Songwriter, singer, "Gimme Little Sign", "The Oogum Boogum Song".
 Misty Copeland, Principal Ballet Dancer for the American Ballet Theatre
 Ed Jurak, MLB utility infielder for the Red Sox, Giants and Athletics 1982-1989
 Yuri Kochiyama, human rights activist

References

External links 

 

High schools in Los Angeles
San Pedro, Los Angeles
Los Angeles Unified School District schools
Public high schools in California
Educational institutions established in 1903
1903 establishments in California
PWA Moderne architecture in California
Works Progress Administration in California